"Seven Turns" is a song written by Dickey Betts and performed by The Allman Brothers Band.  The song reached No. 12 on the U.S. mainstream rock chart in 1990.  The song appeared on their 1990 album, Seven Turns.

References

1990 singles
Songs written by Dickey Betts
The Allman Brothers Band songs
Epic Records singles
Country rock songs
1990 songs